Kusha may refer to:
 Kusha, One of the lineages of Chandravamsha Kshatriyas
 Kusha-shū (Buddhism), one of six schools of Japanese Buddhism in the Nara period
 Kusha (Ramayana), in Hindu mythology, one of the twin sons of Lord Rama and Sita
 Desmostachya bipinnata (Kusha), a tall tufted perennial grass
 Kucha (woreda) in Ethiopia, sometimes transliterated as "Kusha"
 Ab Bid-e Kusha, a village in Hormozgan Province, Iran
 Chasbaz-e Kusha, a village in Hormozgan Province, Iran
 "Kusha Las Payas", a 2003 song performed by the Andalusian-Spanish pop group Las Ketchup
 Lava Kusha, 1963 film by C. S. Rao and C. Pullaiah

See also 
 Kusa (disambiguation)
 Kush (disambiguation)